The Associazione Italiana Guide e Scouts d'Europa Cattolici (translation: Italian Association Catholic Guides and Scouts of Europe, AIGSEC), better known as Federazione dello Scautismo Europeo (Federation of European Scouting, FSE) or Scouts d'Europa (Scouts of Europe), is a Catholic Scouting and Guiding association in Italy.

Formed in 1976, AIGSEC includes 20,105 members, 203 local groups and 1,361 units, making it the second-largest organisation of that kind in the country, second only to the Associazione Guide e Scouts Cattolici Italiani (AGESCI), born by the merger of the Associazione Scouts Cattolici Italiani (ASCI) with the Associazione Guide Italiane (AGI) in 1974. AIGSEC was founded two years later by former leaders of ASCI and AGI, along with some disgruntled members of AGESCI.

AIGSEC is the second-largest member of the International Union of Guides and Scouts of Europe or European Scouting Federation (UIGSE–FSE), an organisation launched in 1956.

References

External links
Official website

Scouting and Guiding in Italy
Youth organizations established in 1976
1976 establishments in Italy